The 1941 Princeton Tigers football team was an American football team that represented Princeton University in the Ivy League during the 1941 college football season.  In its fourth season under head coach Tad Wieman, the team compiled a 2–6 record and was outscored by a total of 152 to 64. The team played its home games at Palmer Stadium in Princeton, New Jersey.

Schedule

References

Princeton
Princeton Tigers football seasons
Princeton Tigers football